The 59th edition of the Vuelta a España (Tour of Spain), a long-distance bicycle stage race and one of the three grand tours, was held from 4 September to 26 September 2004.

Halfway through the 2004 Vuelta, it appeared it would become an easy win for Heras, but in the last week his fellow countryman Santiago Pérez won two heavy mountain stages, thus becoming an important rival. Eventually Heras won with only 30 seconds advantage on Pérez. Pérez and Phonak hearing systems teammate Tyler Hamilton would later test positive for blood doping from blood samples taken during the race. Francisco Mancebo, also from Spain took third. The first non-Spaniard was Stefano Garzelli from Italy in 11th. The points classification was won by Erik Zabel from Germany, the mountains classification was won by Félix Cárdenas from Colombia and the combination classification was won by Roberto Heras. Kelme was the winner of the team ranking. Alessandro Petacchi, an Italian sprinter won four stages, but he did not finish the Vuelta.

Teams and riders

Route

Jersey progress

General classification (final)

References

External links
La Vuelta (Official site in Spanish, English, and French)
 Cyclingnews.com 2004 Vuelta a Espana coverage

 
2004
2004 in road cycling
2004 in Spanish sport